Nico Parker (born 9 December 2004) is a British actress. She made her film debut as Milly Farrier in the Walt Disney Pictures film Dumbo (2019), directed by Tim Burton.

Early life 
Born at home to film director and screenwriter Ol Parker and actress Thandiwe Newton, Parker is from Kensal Rise, North West London. She has an older sister, Ripley, and a younger brother, Booker.

Career 
Parker made her acting debut as Milly Farrier in the 2019 film Dumbo, directed by Tim Burton. The role brought her widespread recognition. She next starred alongside Naomie Harris and Jude Law in the HBO miniseries The Third Day (2020) and appeared alongside her mother as Zoe in the science fiction film Reminiscence (2021).

Parker made a guest appearance as Sarah in the first episode of the HBO adaptation of The Last of Us. Parker's guest appearance was universally acclaimed by critics, with the consensus being that the premiere "benefits immeasurably from [her] endearing contribution." Rachel Leishman in a review for The Mary Sue called Parker's casting "brilliant" and said: "It’s such a good performance from Parker that matches the energy of Pascal's Joel in a way that I think many are going to be talking about Nico Parker's take on the character." Parker was named a 2023 Bright Young Thing by Tatler.

Filmography

Film

Television

References

External links 
 
 

2004 births
Living people
21st-century English actresses
Actresses from London
Black British actresses
English child actresses
English film actresses
English people of Zimbabwean descent
English television actresses
People from Kensal Green